Dale's Pale Archeological District is a set of historic archaeological sites and national historic district located near Chester, Chesterfield County, Virginia.  The district consists of a collection of four county owned archaeological sites.  They are the location of a defensive palisade built by Sir Thomas Dale in 1613 around the original settlement at Bermuda Hundred, which he founded.
It is a two mile long, berm-and-ditch feature, running between the high banks overlooking the James and Appomattox Rivers. The other sites within the district include a Middle Woodland Period (500 BC–
AD 200) settlement, and a late 17th- or early 18th-century house with its associated dump.

It was listed on the National Register of Historic Places in 2007.

References

Archaeological sites on the National Register of Historic Places in Virginia
Geography of Chesterfield County, Virginia
National Register of Historic Places in Chesterfield County, Virginia
Historic districts on the National Register of Historic Places in Virginia